"Por Ti Baby" (English: "For You Baby") is a song by Mexican-American cumbia group A.B. Quintanilla Y Los Kumbia All Starz featuring Panamanian singer Flex. It was released on January 22, 2008 as the first single from their second studio album Planeta Kumbia (2008).

Remix
A remix called "Por Ti Baby (Regional Mexican Remix)" was made. It was released on the radio but never on a CD or as a digital download. Two versions of the remix was made with the same rhythm but with different singers. The first has Ricky Rick and Flex singing and the second has Ricky Rick and DJ Kane singing.
 "Por Ti Baby (Regional Mexican Remix)" (featuring Flex)
 "Por Ti Baby (Regional Mexican Remix)"

Track listing
Digital download
 "Por Ti Baby" (featuring Flex) – 3:10

Personnel
 Written by A.B. Quintanilla III and Luigi Giraldo
 Produced by A.B. Quintanilla III and Luigi Giraldo
 Lead vocals by Ricky Rick and Flex
 Background vocals by A.B. Quintanilla
 First remix lead vocals by Ricky Rick and Flex
 Second remix lead vocals by Ricky Rick and DJ Kane

Charts

References

External links
 "Por Ti Baby" (Music Video) at YouTube

2008 singles
Kumbia All Starz songs
Flex (singer) songs
Songs written by A. B. Quintanilla
Song recordings produced by A. B. Quintanilla
Spanish-language songs
2008 songs
EMI Latin singles